The A3 motorway is a route in North Macedonia, that is only partly a divided motorway.

After the independence of North Macedonia, the roads were renumbered. A part of the M26 and the entire M27 were merged into the M-5. These road numbers have existed until September 30, 2011. On that day, the M-5 was renumbered A3.

References

Motorways in North Macedonia